Moriyama Station (森山駅, Moriyama-eki) is a train station located in Moriyama-machi, Isahaya, Nagasaki Prefecture. The station is serviced by Shimabara Railway and is a part of the Shimabara Railway Line.

Lines 
The train station is serving for the Shimabara Railway Line with the local trains and some express train stop at the station.

Station layout

Platforms 
Moriyama Station contains two side platforms with two tracks, both served for the Shimabara Railway Line.

Adjacent stations 

|-
|colspan=5 style="text-align:center;" |Shimabara Railway

See also 
 List of railway stations in Japan

References

External links 
 

Railway stations in Japan opened in 1911
Railway stations in Nagasaki Prefecture
Stations of Shimabara Railway